Michael Thomas van Vuuren (born 28 September 1991) is an English qualified, South African rugby union footballer. His regular playing position is hooker.

Career

Youth and Varsity rugby

He was schooled at Grey High School in Port Elizabeth and matriculated in 2009. He played in the Grey first team in 2008 and 2009, alongside Siya Kolisi who is also an Old Grey.

Free State Cheetahs

Stade Français

Van Vuuren joined French Top 14 side Stade Français ahead of the 2012–13 Top 14 season, signing a two-year deal until June 2014.

He made his debut for Stade Francais in the French Top 14 as a replacement against Biarritz on 4 May 2013.

Eastern Province Kings

Van Vuuren returned to South Africa to join Port Elizabeth-based side  prior to the 2014 Currie Cup Premier Division. He had an eventful debut for the EP Kings as he came off the bench shortly after half-time, was sent to the sin bin within ten minutes of coming on and scored a try just after his return to the field.

Van Vuuren left the Eastern Province Kings in December; financial problems and non-payment of salaries at the Eastern Province Rugby Union resulted in all players being given the option to terminate their contracts and Van Vuuren exercised this option, announcing that he would leave the side and seek legal advice regarding the unpaid salaries.

Leicester Tigers

Shortly after leaving the Eastern Province Kings, Van Vuuren joined Leicester Tigers for a month-long trial period, and represented Leicester Tigers A in the Aviva A League. Van Vuuren extended his stay at Welford Road until mid-March 2016 and made his debut for the Leicester Tigers in the English Premiership in a 47–20 home win against London Irish on 28 February 2016.

Bath

Van Vuuren joined Bath prior to the 2016–17 English Premiership season. Van Vuuren made his debut for the club against Section Paloise on 15 October 2016.

Van Vuuren played 4 games and 104 minutes in the 2017/2018 season for Bath Rugby

London Scottish

Van Vuuren joined London Scottish on loan for a single match in the 2016–17 RFU Championship, and again joined the team on loan in September 2017.

Northampton Saints

Van Vuuren joined Northampton Saints ahead of the 2019/20 season.

Ealing Trailfinders
He joined RFU Championship side Ealing Trailfinders ahead of the 2020–21 season.

Representative rugby

Van Vuuren was a member of the South Africa Under-20 team that competed in the 2011 IRB Junior World Championship.

References

External links
 
 
 

1991 births
Living people
Afrikaner people
Alumni of Grey High School
Free State Cheetahs players
Leicester Tigers players
Rugby union hookers
Rugby union players from East London, Eastern Cape
South Africa Under-20 international rugby union players
South African rugby union players
Stade Français players
Eastern Province Elephants players
Bath Rugby players
London Scottish F.C. players
London Irish players
Northampton Saints players
Bedford Blues players
Ampthill RUFC players
Ealing Trailfinders Rugby Club players
Wasps RFC players
Lions (United Rugby Championship) players
Golden Lions players